Michael Connell Biehn (born July 31, 1956) is an American actor, primarily known for his roles in science fiction films directed by James Cameron; as Sgt. Kyle Reese in The Terminator (1984), Cpl. Dwayne Hicks in Aliens (1986), and Lt. Coffey in The Abyss (1989). His other films include The Fan (1981), Navy SEALs (1990), Tombstone (1993), The Rock (1996), Megiddo: The Omega Code 2 (2001), and Planet Terror (2007). On television, he has appeared in Hill Street Blues (1984), The Magnificent Seven (1998–2000), and Adventure Inc. (2002–2003). Biehn received a Best Actor Saturn Award nomination for Aliens.

Early life
Biehn was born in Anniston, Alabama, the second of three boys born to Marcia (née Connell) and Don Biehn, a lawyer. He is of German descent on his father's side and Irish on his mother's side. When he was young, he moved with his family to Lincoln, Nebraska, and then to Lake Havasu City, Arizona, where he was a member of the high school drama club before graduating. He attended the drama program at the University of Arizona, where he was a member of the Sigma Nu fraternity before moving to Hollywood.

Career
Biehn got his start in movies with a bit part in the film version of Grease in 1978. He appears in two scenes, one in which John Travolta's character, Danny, hits Biehn's uncredited character in the stomach while playing basketball. 

In 1981, he appeared in the role of Douglas Breen, a stalker, in the 1981 film version of Bob Randall's novel The Fan, starring Lauren Bacall. In 1984, Biehn played Sgt. Kyle Reese, a soldier sent back in time by John Connor to save his mother, Sarah Connor, in the film The Terminator opposite Arnold Schwarzenegger and Linda Hamilton. He starred in two other films directed by James Cameron: Aliens (as Corporal Hicks) and The Abyss (as Lieutenant Hiram Coffey), and had a small role in Terminator 2: Judgment Day, briefly reprising his role as Reese in a scene cut from the final film but restored for the Director's Cut version. He was considered to portray the film's antagonist, the T-1000, but the role went to Robert Patrick. In 2019, Biehn confirmed in an interview that he would not be reprising the role for Terminator: Dark Fate or any other future installments. In the same interview, Biehn claimed that he was initially not enthusiastic about appearing in a Schwarzenegger film, as he had hoped to act alongside the likes of Al Pacino and Robert De Niro.

In an early draft of Alien 3 written by William Gibson, Biehn's character Hicks (who had survived the events of Aliens) was to become the protagonist, replacing Ellen Ripley (Sigourney Weaver). Walter Hill and David Giler wrote the final script, which had Hicks killed off in the opening scene. Biehn, upon learning of his character's demise, demanded and received almost as much money for the use of his likeness in one scene as he had been paid for his role in Aliens. Biehn reprised the role of Hicks by voicing the character in the video game Aliens: Colonial Marines and again in 2019 for an audio drama adaptation of Gibson's un-filmed script for Alien 3 released by Audible. Biehn played the role of Johnny Ringo in Tombstone including the showdown scene with Val Kilmer as Doc Holiday.

In the 2000s, Biehn took acting roles ranging from big budget films such as The Art of War and Clockstoppers, to video games like Command & Conquer: Tiberian Sun and independent movies, such as Havoc. He also starred in three TV series including the CBS drama The Magnificent Seven (1998–2000), the Tribune Entertainment syndicated TV series Adventure Inc. (2002–2003), and the NBC TV series Hawaii (2004). All three shows were subsequently cancelled because of low ratings. Biehn was considered to portray Colonel Miles Quaritch, the main antagonist of James Cameron's science fiction epic film Avatar (2009), but Cameron felt his appearance in the film coupled with that of Weaver would remind people too much of Aliens.

Biehn directed the 2010 film The Blood Bond. In 2011 he wrote, directed and starred in The Victim. In 2020, Biehn was cast as the villain Lang in the second season of the Star Wars television series The Mandalorian. In 2022, he portrayed Ian in the eleventh season of the AMC horror series The Walking Dead.

Personal life

Biehn is now married to actress Jennifer Blanc who co-produced and starred alongside him in The Victim. The couple have one son, Dashiell King Biehn (*2015).

Filmography

References

External links

 
 
 
 Phoenix – Michael Biehn Archive

20th-century American male actors
21st-century American male actors
Living people
Male actors from Arizona
Male actors from Nebraska
American male film actors
American male television actors
American male video game actors
American male voice actors
Male Western (genre) film actors
American people of German descent
American people of Irish descent
Actors from Lincoln, Nebraska
People from Anniston, Alabama
People from Lake Havasu City, Arizona
University of Arizona alumni
1956 births